Matthías Orri Sigurðarson (born 29 September 1994) is an Icelandic basketball player for Úrvalsdeild karla club KR and a former member of the Icelandic men's national basketball team.

Playing career
After starting his career with KR in 2010, Matthías Orri had is breakout season with ÍR in 2013–2014 when he averaged 16.8 points and 6.7 assists. In 2014–2015, he upped his scoring average to 19.2 points while also averaging 5.9 assists and 5.6 rebounds.

After spending the 2015–2016 season with Columbus State University, Matthías resigned with ÍR on May 13, 2016.

In April 2017, Matthías signed a 2-year contract extension with ÍR.

After helping ÍR reach the Úrvalsdeild finals in 2019, where it lost to KR, Matthías was named to the Úrvalsdeild Domestic All-First Team.

On 29 May 2019, Matthías signed with KR along with his brother Jakob Sigurðarson.

In August 2021, Matthías stated that he was unsure if he would play for KR during the seasons as his passion for basketball had diminished considerably. After sitting out the 2021–2022 season, he joined KR's reserve team, KR-b, ahead of the 2022–2023 season. On 16 October 2022, he had 4 points and 5 assists for KR-b against KR in the Icelandic Cup. On 20 December 2022, it was reported that he had resumed training with KR's senior team. On 29 December 2022, Matthías played his first game for the senior team in almost two years.

National team career
Matthías played his first games for the senior national team at the 2017 Games of the Small States of Europe, helping Iceland win bronze.

Personal life
Matthías is the younger brother of professional basketball player Jakob Sigurðarson.

References

External links
 Profile at realgm.com
 2007-2016 statistics at kki.is

1994 births
Living people
Columbus State University alumni
Flagler College alumni
Matthías Orri Sigurðarson
Matthías Orri Sigurðarson
Matthías Orri Sigurðarson
Matthías Orri Sigurðarson
Point guards
Matthías Orri Sigurðarson
Matthías Orri Sigurðarson